Arsen Iqaltoeli or Arsen of Iqalto (died c. 1127) was a Georgian churchman, theologian, calligrapher and religious author with noticeable role in the ecclesiastic life of Georgia in the reign of David IV "the Builder" (r. 1089—1125) with whom he collaborated in rearing the Georgian monastic academes. His formidable efforts at translating and compiling major doctrinal and polemical work from Greek gave a novel impetus to the Georgian patristic and philosophical literature. Iqaltoeli is canonized by the Georgian Orthodox Church, which commemorates him on February 6 (19).

Life 

Arsen is apparently the same person as Arsen Vachesdze mentioned in several manuscripts. Furthermore, some Georgian scholars identify him with Arsen Beri (Arsenius "the Monk"; fl. 1100), the author of the metaphrastic revision of The Life of Saint Nino. According to historic tradition Arsen was born in Iqalto in the province of Kakheti, east of Tbilisi, Georgia's modern capital. He was educated in Constantinople at the Mangana academy, the centre of Byzantine philosophical activity and classical learning, and served as a monk on the Black Mountain near Antioch under the tutelage of Ephraim the Minor. Around 1114, Iqaltoeli, along with several other Georgian repatriate monks, responded to King David IV's call to join the reconstructed Georgian church. Along with John of Petrizos, Iqaltoeli brought the Byzantine philosophical tradition to the newly founded Georgian academe at Gelati and helped found a similar academy at Iqalto. Finally he established himself at the Shio-Mgvime monastery in Kakheti.

Iqaltoeli probably played a key role in the debate between Armenian and Georgian churchmen organized by David IV in a futile attempt to reconcile doctrinal differences between the two churches in 1123. He outlived David and composed the king's epitaph.

Most of Iqaltoeli's work both abroad and in Georgia consists of translations of major doctrinal and polemical work, which he compiled as his massive Dogmatikon, "a book of teachings", influenced by Aristotelianism. The most complete surviving manuscript of this work (S-1463) dates to the 12th-13th century and includes sixteen key authors, such as Anastasius Sinaita, John of Damascus, Theodore Abucara, Michael Psellos, Cyril of Alexandria, Nikitas Stithatos, Pope Leo the Great and others.

References 

1120s deaths
Christian monks from Georgia (country)
Writers from Georgia (country)
Translators from Georgia (country)
Philosophers from Georgia (country)
Saints of Georgia (country)
Year of birth unknown
Calligraphers from Georgia (country)